Al-Hazem SC (also spelled Alhazem) is a Saudi professional football club based in Ar Rass, that competes in the Saudi Professional League, the first tier of Saudi football. It was founded in 1957.

Al-Hazem colors are red, yellow and blue. Al-Hazem have won the Saudi Third Division once in the 1997–98 season, and have finished runners-up once in the Saudi Second Division once in the 1999–00 season. The club have won the Saudi First Division once in the 2004–05 season and won their first promotion to the Pro League. The club spent 6 consecutive seasons in the top flight before getting relegated.

The club play their home games at Al-Hazem Club Stadium in Ar Rass, sharing the stadium with city rivals Al-Kholood.

Honours
Saudi First Division/MS League
Winners (2): 2004–05, 2020–21
Runners-up (1): 2017–18

Saudi Second Division
Runners-up (1): 1999–2000

Saudi Third Division
Winners (1): 1997–98

Al-Qassim Regional League
Winners (9): 1967–68, 1969–70, 1970–71, 1971–72, 1980–81, 1984–85, 1990–91, 1994–95, 1997–98

Current squad 
As of 15 September 2021:

Out on loan

Former players

  Rashed Al-Mugren (Saudi Arabia international)

Managerial history

 Boualem Laroum (1997 – 2000)
 Omar Meziane (2000)
 Khalid Al-Koroni (10 November 2000 – 27 March 2001, March 17, 2005 – May 20, 2005)
 Saad Soleit (caretaker) (27 March 2001 – 1 May 2001)
 Boualem Laroum (25 June 2001 – 5 December 2001)
 Ali Komaikh (6 December 2001 – 1 April 2002)
 Nizar Mahrous (August 1, 2002 – October 14, 2002)
 Saleh Al-Mutlaq (October 14, 2002 – October 25, 2002)
 José Fernandes (October 14, 2002 – January 22, 2003)
 Fathi Al-Jabal (January 22, 2003 – April 1, 2003)
 Carlos (caretaker) (1 April 2003 – 1 May 2003)
 Gamal Abdel-Hamid (July 9, 2003 – October 12, 2003)
 Nasser Ben Alya (October 12, 2003 – 16 December 2003)
 Leonida Nedelcu (16 December 2003 – February 9, 2004)
 Hamada Sedki (February 9, 2004 – December 11, 2004)
 Mondher Ladhari (December 11, 2004 – March 17, 2005, February 19, 2006 – April 30, 2006, July 8, 2012 – December 8, 2012)
 Ahmad Al-Ajlani (June 1, 2005 – February 18, 2006, June 25, 2006 – December 2, 2006)
 Lula Pereira (December 2, 2006 – May 5, 2007, December 2, 2009 – May 1, 2010)
 José Morais (June 4, 2007 – December 7, 2007)
 Ammar Souayah (December 23, 2007 – May 30, 2009)
 Mohsen Saleh (July 27, 2009 – November 28, 2009)
 Lutfi Rhim (July 14, 2010 – October 29, 2010)
 Fathi Al-Heric (October 29, 2010 – November 12, 2010)
 Goran Miscevic (November 13, 2010 – May 31, 2011)
 Marinko Koljanin (June 23, 2011 – May 26, 2012)
 Abdullah Darwish (December 8, 2012 – September 23, 2013)
 Yousef Anbar (September 23, 2013 – March 25, 2014, October 14, 2014 – March 4, 2015)
 Saleem bin Mubarak (March 26, 2014 – April 20, 2014, March 4, 2015 – June 1, 2015)
 Ali Komaikh (April 20, 2014 – October 10, 2014)
 Lotfi Sellimi (June 22, 2015 – November 15, 2015)
 Nasser Nefzi (November 17, 2015 – February 19, 2016)
 Hatem Boulila (February 19, 2016 – May 1, 2016)
 Khalil Al-Masri (July 9, 2016 – May 18, 2017)
 Habib Ben Romdhane (June 20, 2017 – April 5, 2018)
 Abdulwahab Al-Harbi (April 5, 2018 – May 5, 2018)
 Daniel Isăilă (June 8, 2018 – January 31, 2020)
 André (January 31, 2020 – September 10, 2020)
 Mohammed Dahmane (September 23, 2020 – June 1, 2021)
 Hélder (June 7, 2021 – November 27, 2021)
 Constantin Gâlcă (December 6, 2021 – February 21, 2022)
 Roel Coumans (March 1, 2022 – June 28, 2022)
 Filipe Gouveia (July 5, 2022 – )

References

goalzz

Hazem
Hazem
Hazem
Hazem